Justin Jonathan Jackson (born 10 December 1974 in Nottingham, England) is a former professional footballer, who last played for Southern League Premier Division side Brackley Town. He joined Brackley Town in July 2007.

Earlier in 2007, Jackson was expected to join Tamworth however was unable to gain international clearance from The Football Federation of Australia, who stated that they were not prepared to change his status from amateur to professional due to a transfer window imposed by FIFA. He had last played as an amateur for Casey Comets SC in Australia. Jackson continued to train with Tamworth in an attempt to secure a playing contract for the next season.

Earlier in his career, Jackson, enjoyed spells with Halifax Town and Morecambe. Jackson was the conference top scorer with 29 league goals in 99/00 in his only season at Morecambe, and in 2000 signed for Rushden & Diamonds for £180,000, a record transfer fee between two non-League clubs.

After clinching promotion to Division Three he soon moved on to Doncaster Rovers for £150,000 but it ended with the chairman paying up his contract and on 3 October he joined Accrington Stanley. Six weeks later his contract was cancelled when it was reported he failed to turn up for training. He then moved to Chester City on trial but was taken off during his trial game for the reserves and was not signed by the club.

In November 2004 Justin signed for Nationwide North club Stafford Rangers but did not even stay long enough to get match fit.

In the 2006–07 Jackson was nominated for the non-league goal of the year, though he did not make the top three.

Honours 
Woking
 FA Trophy: 1996–97

References

External links
 
 

Living people
1974 births
Association football forwards
Lancaster City F.C. players
Ayr United F.C. players
Ilkeston Town F.C. (1945) players
Woking F.C. players
Notts County F.C. players
Morecambe F.C. players
Rotherham United F.C. players
Halifax Town A.F.C. players
Rushden & Diamonds F.C. players
Doncaster Rovers F.C. players
Accrington Stanley F.C. players
Tamworth F.C. players
Brackley Town F.C. players
English footballers
Footballers from Nottingham
English Football League players
National League (English football) players
Penrith F.C. players
England semi-pro international footballers
Stafford Rangers F.C. players